Sealed Cargo is a 2015 Bolivian drama film directed by Julia Vargas-Weise. It was selected as the Bolivian entry for the Best Foreign Language Film at the 89th Academy Awards but it was not nominated.

Plot
A police mariscal and his crew try to dump a mysterious freight of toxic minerals from a train, but the population has been alarmed.

Cast
 Gustavo Sánchez Parra as Mariscal
 Luis Bredow as Agustin Klinger
 Fernando Arze as Antonio Urdimala
 Daniela Lema as Tania Tintaya
 Marcelo Nina as Choque
 Prakriti Maduro as Nena

See also
 List of submissions to the 89th Academy Awards for Best Foreign Language Film
 List of Bolivian submissions for the Academy Award for Best Foreign Language Film

References

External links
 
 

2015 films
2015 drama films
2010s Spanish-language films
Bolivian drama films